1863 West Sydney colonial by-election may refer to 

 1863 West Sydney colonial by-election 1 held on 8 January 1863
 1863 West Sydney colonial by-election 2 held on 30 October 1863

See also
 List of New South Wales state by-elections